Øresund or Öresund, commonly known in English as the Sound, is a strait which forms the Danish–Swedish border, separating Zealand (Denmark) from Scania (Sweden).

Øresund, along with the Great Belt, the Little Belt and the Kiel Canal, is one of four waterways that connect the Baltic Sea to the Atlantic Ocean via Kattegat, Skagerrak, and the North Sea; this makes it one of the busiest waterways in the world.

The Øresund Bridge, between the Danish capital Copenhagen and the Swedish city of Malmö, inaugurated on 1 July 2000, connects a bi-national metropolitan area with close to 4 million inhabitants. The HH Ferry route, between Helsingør, Denmark and Helsingborg, Sweden, in the northern part of Øresund, is one of the world's busiest international ferry routes, with more than 70 departures from each harbour per day.

Øresund is a geologically young strait that formed 8500–8000 years ago as a result of rising sea levels. Previously the Ancylus Lake, a fresh-water body occupying the Baltic basin, had been connected to the sea solely via the Great Belt. The incursion of salt water via Øresund marked the beginning of the modern Baltic Sea as a salt-water body.

Name
The strait is called Øresund in Danish and Öresund in Swedish, informally Sundet (lit. "the Sound") in both languages.
The first part of the name is øre "gravel/sand beach", and the second part is sund, i.e. "sound, strait".

The name is first attested on a runestone dated to ca. AD 1000, where it is written as ura suti, read as Old East Norse  (the dative case). 
The Old West Norse (and modern Icelandic) form of the name is Eyrarsund. 
Ør is the modern form of the old Norse word (aur) meaning a gravel beach or shoal (see also ayre), often forming a spit. Such landforms are common in the area and "ör" is found in many place names along the strait, e.g. Helsingør, Skanör, Dragør and Halör, an important center of trade during the Viking Age.

Boundaries 
The northern boundary between Øresund and Kattegat is a line which goes from Gilleleje at Zealand's northern peak to the westernmost point of Kullaberg (Kullen's Lighthouse) at the smaller peninsula north of Helsingborg, known as Kullahalvön. In the south, the boundary towards the Baltic Sea starts at Stevns Klint, at the westernmost peak of the peninsula just south of Køge Bay, Stevns Peninsula to Falsterbo at the Falsterbo peninsula. 
Its eastern boundary is the Swedish coastline; to the west Amager may be considered part of Øresund (in which case it is the largest island) or a part of Zealand. Amager has eight connections with Zealand (two street bridges, a road bridge, a motorway bridge, a dual-track railway tunnel, an underground metro and a bicycle bridge) as well as a combined motorway and dual track railway to Scania and Sweden.

Streams, animals and salinity
Øresund, like other Danish and Danish-German straits, is at the border between oceanic salt water (which has a salinity of more than 30 PSU or per mille by weight) and the far less salty Baltic Sea.

As the Kattegat in the north has almost oceanic conditions and the Baltic Sea (around 7 PSU, in its main basin) has brackish water, Øresund's water conditions are rather unusual and shifting. The streams are very complex, but the surface stream is often northbound (from the Baltic Sea) which gives a lower surface salinity, though streams can change from one day to another. The average surface salinity is about 10–12 PSU in the southern part, but above 20 PSU north of Helsingør.

Near the seafloor (where the sea is deep enough), conditions are more stable and salinity is always oceanic (above 30 PSU) below a certain depth that varies between 10 and 15 metres. In the southern part, however, the depth is 5–6 metres (outside the rather narrow waterways Drogden and Flintrännan), and this is the definite border of oceanic salt water, therefore also a border for many maritime species of animals. Only 52 known salt-water species reside in the central Baltic Sea, compared to around 1500 in the North Sea. Close to 600 species are known to exist in at least some part of Øresund. Well-known examples, for which the bottom salinity makes a distinct breeding border, include lobster, small crabs (Carcinus maenas), several species of flatfish and the lion's mane jellyfish; the latter can sometimes drift into the southwest Baltic Sea, but it cannot reproduce there.

There are daily tides, but the lunar attraction cannot force much water to move from west to east, or vice versa, in narrow waters where the current is either northbound or southbound. So, not much of the difference in water levels in Øresund is due to daily tides, and other circumstances "hide" the little tide that still remains. The current has a much stronger effect than the tide on the water level, but strong winds may also affect the water level. During exceptional conditions, such as storms and hurricanes, oceanic water may suddenly flow into the Baltic Sea at all depths. Such events give deep waters in the southern Baltic Sea higher salinity, which makes it possible for cod to breed there. If no such inflow of oceanic water to the Baltic Sea occurs for around a decade, the breeding of cod becomes endangered.

History

Political control of Øresund has been an important issue in Danish and Swedish history. Denmark maintained military control with the coastal fortress of Kronborg at Elsinore on the west side and Kärnan at Helsingborg on the east, until the eastern shore was ceded to Sweden in 1658, based on the Treaty of Roskilde. Both fortresses are located where the strait is 4 kilometres wide.

In 1429, King Eric of Pomerania introduced the Sound Dues which remained in effect for more than four centuries, until 1857. Transitory dues on the use of waterways, roads, bridges and crossings were then an accepted way of taxing which could constitute a great part of a state's income. 
The Strait Dues remained the most important source of income for the Danish Crown for several centuries, thus making Danish kings relatively independent of Denmark's privy council and aristocracy.

To be independent of the Øresund, Sweden carried out two great projects: the foundation of Gothenburg in 1621 and the construction of the Göta Canal from 1810 to 1832.

The Copenhagen Convention of 1857 abolished the Dues and made the Danish straits an international waterway.

A fixed connection was opened across the strait in 2000, the Øresund Bridge.

Notable islands

Denmark
 Amager (western part is artificial enlargement from Øresund, or from Kalvebodene more precisely) 
 Saltholm
 Peberholm – an artificial island
 Middelgrundsfortet – an artificial island
 Flakfortet – an artificial island
 Amager Strandpark - an artificial beach area for Copenhagen
 Brøndby Strandpark - an artificial beach area for Copenhagen in Køge Bugt
 Vallensbæk-Ishøj Strandpark - an artificial beach area for Copenhagen in Køge Bugt

Sweden
 Ven (Hven in Danish)
 Gråen – an artificial island outside port of Landskrona (enlargements from Øresund in the 17th and 20th centuries)

Notable sights

Denmark
 Køge Bugt (Køge Bay)
 Nivå Bugt (Nivå Bay)
 Kalveboderne

Sweden
 Lundåkrabukten (Lundåkra Bay)
 Lommabukten (Lomma Bay)
 Höllviken

See also

 Great Belt
 Little Belt
 Kiel Canal
 Øresund Region
 Øresund Bridge
 Øresund station on the Copenhagen Metro
 Øresundsmetro - a proposed bi-national metro system serving Copenhagen and Malmö

References

Notes

Bibliography
 Menefee, Samuel Pyeatt, "The Strait Dues and Access to the Baltic Sea" in Renate Platzoder and Philomene Verlaan (eds.), The Baltic Sea: New Developments in National Policies and International Co-Operation  (1996), pp. 101–32.

External links

 Øresunddirekt – Official public information site for the inhabitants of the Øresund region
 Øresund Trends – An official public information site with up-to-date information on the region, available in English
 Øresundstid – The History of the Øresund Region 

 
Straits of the Baltic Sea
Straits of Denmark
Straits of Sweden
Denmark–Sweden border
Geography of Copenhagen
Landforms of Skåne County
Scania
International straits
Seas of Denmark